Ateloglossa is a genus of bristle flies in the family Tachinidae. There are about 14 described species in Ateloglossa.

Species
Ateloglossa algens (Curran, 1926)
Ateloglossa borealis (Coquillett, 1900)
Ateloglossa cinerea Coquillett, 1899
Ateloglossa erythrocera (Thomson, 1869)
Ateloglossa gillettei (Townsend, 1892)
Ateloglossa glabra West, 1925
Ateloglossa isolata (West, 1924)
Ateloglossa johnsoni (West, 1924)
Ateloglossa marginalis (Curran, 1924)
Ateloglossa novaeangliae (West, 1924)
Ateloglossa ochreicornis (Townsend, 1916)
Ateloglossa regina (West, 1924)
Ateloglossa trivittata Curran, 1930
Ateloglossa wickhami (Townsend, 1915)

References

Dexiinae
Taxa named by Daniel William Coquillett
Tachinidae genera